Rac GTPase-activating protein 1 is an enzyme that in humans is encoded by the RACGAP1 gene.

Function 

Rho GTPases control a variety of cellular processes. There are 3 subtypes of Rho GTPases in the Ras superfamily of small G proteins: RHO (see MIM 165370), RAC (see RAC1; MIM 602048), and CDC42 (MIM 116952). GTPase-activating proteins (GAPs) bind activated forms of Rho GTPases and stimulate GTP hydrolysis. Through this catalytic function, Rho GAPs negatively regulate Rho-mediated signals. GAPs may also serve as effector molecules and play a role in signaling downstream of Rho and other Ras-like GTPases.[supplied by OMIM]. Over-expression of RACGAP1 is observed in multiple human cancers including breast cancer, gastric cancer and colorectal cancer. Evidence show that RACGAP1 can modulate mitochondrial quality control by stimulating mitopahy and mitochondrial biogenesis in breast cancer. Knocking out RACGAP1 in vitro using CRISPR/Cas9 leads to cytokinesis failure.

Interactions 

RACGAP1 has been shown to interact with ECT2, Rnd2 and SLC26A8.

During cytokinesis, RACGAP1 has been shown to interact with KIF23 to form the centralspindlin complex.  This complex is essential for the formation of the central spindle. RACGAP1 also interacts with PRC1 to stabilize and maintain the central spindle as anaphase proceeds. RACGAP1 can also interact with ECT2 during anaphase of cytokinesis, loss of RACGAP1 leads to cytokinesis failure.

References

Further reading